Antal is clan (gotra) of Jats found mainly in Punjab besides it is also surname of Hungarian origin.Notable people with the surname include:

Female
Dana Antal (born 1977), Canadian ice hockey player
Dóra Antal (born 1993), Hungarian water polo player
Márta Antal-Rudas, known as Márta Rudas (1937–2017), Hungarian javelin athlete
Veronica Antal (1935–1958), Romanian beatified Catholic

Male
Botond Antal (born 1991), Hungarian football 
Elöd Antal (born 1955), Romanian ice hockey player
 Emese Antal, Romanian speedskater
 Frederick Antal, Hungarian art historian
 Imre Antal (1935–2008), Hungarian entertainer
István Antal (1896 – 1975), Hungarian politician
Istvan Antal (ice hockey) (1958–2009), Romanian ice hockey player
János Antal (1888 – ???), Hungarian middle-distance athlete
Jarolím Antal Slovak etiquette and protocol expert
 Károly Antal, Hungarian sculptor
 Liviu Antal, (born 1989). Romanian footballer 
 László Antal, Hungarian linguist 
Laszlo Antal (sport shooter) (1936–2010), Hungarian-born sports shooter
 Milan Antal, Slovak astronomer
 Nimród Antal, Hungarian-American film director, screenwriter and actor
Róbert Antal (1921–1995), Hungarian water polo player
Vratussa Antal, birthname of Anton Vratuša (1915–2017), Slovenian politician and diplomat
Zoltán Antal (born 1971), Hungarian canoer
Zsolt Antal (born 1972), Romanian cross-country skier

See also

 Antal, gotra of Jats
Antão, name